A wand is a thin, straight, hand-held stick of wood, ivory, or metal.

Wand or magic wand may also refer to:

People
Günter Wand, a German orchestra conductor and composer
Hart Wand, an early white American blues musician and composer from Oklahoma City
John W C Wand, an Anglican archbishop of Brisbane, Australia
Seth Wand, an American football offensive tackle
Walter Rudi Wand, a German judge
Wand Bewossen, a military figure in Ethiopian history
Wanderlei Silva, Brazilian mixed martial artist

Music
Wand (band), an American psychedelic rock band 
Wands (band), a 3-member Japanese rock music group
Wand Records, a record company
"The W.A.N.D. (The Will Always Negates Defeat)," a song by The Flaming Lips
Magic Wands, a band from Los Angeles, CA

Media
WAND (TV), an NBC affiliate in Decatur, Illinois
Magic Wand (software), a word-processing program for CP/M-based computers first released in 1979
Nyko Wand, a 3rd-party alternative to the Wii Remote
Magic Wand Speak & Learn, an electronic educational toy introduced in 1982 by Texas Instruments

Erotic
Wand vibrator, a type of vibrator
Hitachi Magic Wand, a well-known brand of wand vibrator
Prince's wand, a piece of body piercing jewellery
Violet wand, a device used for the application of low current, high voltage, high frequency electricity to the body

Tarot
 Suit of Wands, a card suit used in tarot
 Ace of Wands, the ace card from the suit Suit of Wands
 Two of Wands, the second card from the Suit of Wands
 Three of Wands, the third card from the Suit of Wands
 Four of Wands, the fourth card from the Suit of Wands
 Five of Wands, the fifth card from the Suit of Wands
 Six of Wands, the sixth card from the Suit of Wands
 Seven of Wands, the seventh card from the Suit of Wands
 Eight of Wands, the eighth card from the Suit of Wands
 Nine of Wands, the ninth card from the Suit of Wands
 Ten of Wands, the tenth card from the Suit of Wands
 Knight of Wands, the knight card from the Suit of Wands
 Queen of Wands, the queen card from the Suit of Wands
 King of Wands, the king card from the Suit of Wands

Other uses
Wand (Wall), a 1994 painting by Gerhard Richter
Women's Action for New Directions, a nonprofit organization
Magic Wand (missile defense), or David's Sling, an Israeli-American interception system
Magic wand, a selection tool in image-editing software
Magic wand, an operator in separation logic
W And, a variable star